Cambridge Town Club (CTC) was a first-class cricket club established in Cambridge before 1817. Among notable players who represented CTC were Tom Hayward senior, Robert Carpenter and George Tarrant. It co-existed with Cambridge University Cricket Club, an entirely separate entity, and the two teams played each other on numerous occasions.

As with similar leading town clubs, the CTC team was representative of the county of Cambridgeshire as a whole and it ultimately evolved into the original Cambridgeshire county club, but various team names were in use and the town and county clubs were effectively the same thing, both of them folding by the end of the 1870s. The names used for first-class matches were Cambridge Town Club (1817–61), Cambridgeshire (1844–71), Cambridge Union Club (1826–33), Cambridge Townsmen (one match only in 1848) and the Cambridge Town and County Club (1844–56). According to the Association of Cricket Statisticians and Historians (ACS), this nomenclature has created a scenario whereby "it is impossible to separate the Town Club from that of the County in major matches". The modern Cambridgeshire County Cricket Club, which plays in the Minor Counties Championship, was founded in 1891 and has no connection with the CTC.

References

Bibliography
 
 
 
 
 

Cricket in Cambridgeshire
English club cricket teams
English cricket in the 19th century
Former senior cricket clubs
History of Cambridgeshire
Sports clubs established in the 1810s